Stone Wave occupies the central courtyard of  Tacoma, Washington's Tacoma Art Museum and is a major public work by sculptor Richard Rhodes of Seattle, Washington. Completed in May, 2003, the wave is constructed using 650 unique pieces of antique Chinese granite laid on a substrate of closed-cell foam and mortar. At once echoing the surging of waves and the volcanic core of Mount Rainier, the sculpture presents a zone of visual serenity among the museum's galleries.

References

Culture of Tacoma, Washington
Tourist attractions in Tacoma, Washington
Outdoor sculptures in Washington (state)
2003 sculptures
Granite sculptures in Washington (state)
2003 establishments in Washington (state)